Uridine 5'-diphospho-glucuronosyltransferase (UDP-glucuronosyltransferase, UGT) is a microsomal glycosyltransferase that catalyzes the transfer of the glucuronic acid component of UDP-glucuronic acid to a small hydrophobic molecule. This is a glucuronidation reaction.

Alternative names:
glucuronyltransferase
UDP-glucuronyl transferase
UDP-GT

Function

Glucuronosyltransferases are responsible for the process of glucuronidation, a major part of phase II metabolism. Arguably the most important of the Phase II (conjugative) enzymes, UGTs have been the subject of increasing scientific inquiry since the mid-to-late 1990s.

The reaction catalyzed by the UGT enzyme involves the addition of a glucuronic acid moiety to xenobiotics and is the most important pathway for the human body's elimination of the most frequently prescribed drugs. It is also the major pathway for foreign chemical (dietary, environmental, pharmaceutical) removal  for most drugs, dietary substances, toxins and endogenous substances.  UGT is present in humans, other animals, plants, and bacteria.  Famously, UGT enzymes are not present in the genus Felis, and this accounts for a number of unusual toxicities in the cat family.

The glucuronidation reaction consists of the transfer of the glucuronosyl group from uridine 5'-diphospho-glucuronic acid (UDPGA) to substrate molecules that contain oxygen, nitrogen, sulfur or carboxyl functional groups.  
The resulting glucuronide is more polar (e.g. hydrophilic) and more easily excreted than the substrate molecule.  The product solubility in blood is increased allowing it to be eliminated from the body by the kidneys.

Diseases
A deficiency in the bilirubin specific form of glucuronosyltransferase is thought to be the cause of Gilbert's syndrome, which is characterized by unconjugated hyperbilirubinemia.

It is also associated with Crigler–Najjar syndrome, a more serious disorder where the enzyme's activity is either completely absent (Crigler–Najjar syndrome type I) or less than 10% of normal (type II).

Infants may have a developmental deficiency in UDP-glucuronyl transferase, and are unable to hepatically metabolize the antibiotic drug chloramphenicol which requires glucuronidation. This leads to a condition known as gray baby syndrome.

Causes

Causes of unconjugated hyperbilirubinemia are divided into three main categories, namely, excessive bilirubin synthesis, liver bilirubin uptake malfunction, and bilirubin conjugation compromise.

As to excessive bilirubin synthesis, both intravascular hemolysis and extravascular hemolysis can involve in the pathophysiology. Additionally, dyserythropoiesis and extravasation of blood into tissues such as angioedema and edema can also lead to indirect hyperbilirubinemia, along with heart failure, medication-induced, ethinyl estradiol, chronic hepatitis, and cirrhosis that are, otherwise, attributed to hepatic bilirubin mal-uptake and bilirubin conjugation compromise, respectively.

Genes
Human genes which encode UGT enzymes include:
 B3GAT1, B3GAT2, B3GAT3
 UGT1A1, UGT1A3, UGT1A4, UGT1A5, UGT1A6, UGT1A7, UGT1A8, UGT1A9, UGT1A10
 UGT2A1, UGT2A2, UGT2A3, UGT2B4, UGT2B7, UGT2B10, UGT2B11, UGT2B15, UGT2B17, UGT2B28

References

External links
 

Transferases
EC 2.4.1